Marno is a settlement in the Municipality of Hrastnik in central Slovenia. It lies just north of the main road east of Dol. The area is part of the traditional region of Styria. It is now included with the rest of the municipality in the Central Sava Statistical Region.

Mass graves
Marno is the site of two known mass graves associated with the Second World War. The grave is believed to encompass the entire margin of the woods—from the road between Marno and Turje to the east, to the bottom of the valley with the creek to the west. The grave contains the remains of several hundred people (Home Guard soldiers and civilians) transported from the Teharje camp and murdered at the beginning of June 1945. It contains an unknown number of victims.

References

External links
Marno on Geopedia

Populated places in the Municipality of Hrastnik